Amira K. Bennison is a historian and currently Professor in Middle Eastern and Islamic Studies in the University of Cambridge and fellow of Magdalene College, Cambridge.

Education
Bennison studied history at Cambridge, graduating in 1989 before switching to Arabic. She then pursued graduate work, with an MA at Harvard in Middle Eastern Studies in 1992, and her PhD at SOAS in Moroccan History in 1996. She was a Leverhulme research fellow at the University of Manchester. She became a lecturer at Cambridge in 1997.

Career

Bennison's book The Great Caliphs: the golden age of the ‘Abbasid empire was reviewed by Hugh N. Kennedy, who said she has "a lively and engaging style", and the book will be "the first port of call for anyone looking for an introduction to the 'golden age of Islam'."

Publications

 Amira K. Bennison. The Almoravid and Almohad Empires. The Edinburgh History of Islamic Empires. Edinburgh University Press 2016. 
 Amira K. Bennison. The Great Caliphs: the golden age of the ‘Abbasid empire. I.B.Tauris 2011. 
 Amira K. Bennison and Alison L. Gascoigne (editors). Cities in The pre-Modern Islamic World: the urban impact of religion, state and society. Routledge 2007. 
 Amira K. Bennison. Jihad and Its Interpretation in Pre-colonial Morocco: State-society Relations During the French Conquest of Algeria. Routledge 2002.

References

External links
 University of Cambridge. Faculty of Asian and Middle Eastern Studies. Dr Amira K Bennison's home page
 Project Muse. An Interview with Amira Bennison Historically Speaking
 The Institute of Ismaili Studies. Conferences, Workshops Content. February 2008. Video: Interview with Dr Amira Bennison

Year of birth missing (living people)
Living people
Alumni of SOAS University of London
Historians of the Middle East
Alumni of the University of Cambridge
Fellows of Magdalene College, Cambridge
Harvard University alumni
British women historians
British historians of Islam